Miami Seaplane Base  is a public-use seaplane base located  east of the central business district of Miami on Watson Island in Miami-Dade County, Florida, United States.

History
In 1926, Chalk's International Airlines built an air terminal on a landfill island, Watson Island, where it continued to operate for over 75 years. Its scheduled and other flights by flying boats and amphibian aircraft served many points in the Bahamas and other nearby destinations.

Chalk's moved its flights to its main engineering and operating base at Fort Lauderdale-Hollywood International Airport after the attacks of September 11, 2001, because of security concerns around PortMiami and increased helicopter traffic around Watson Island. Chalk's ceased operations in December 2005.

The Seaplane Base is utilized by many operators throughout the year for flights within Florida and to The Bahamas.

Airlines and destinations

Scheduled service

Charter operators

Accidents and incidents

On December 19, 2005, Chalk's Ocean Airways Flight 101,a Grumman G-73T Turbine Mallard, crashed off of Miami Beach, Florida. All 20 passengers and crew on board died in the crash, which was attributed to metal fatigue on the starboard wing resulting in separation of the wing from the fuselage.

On July 1, 2018, a Tropic Ocean Airways Cessna 185 crashed on landing into the Miami Seaplane base when the aircraft nosed over into the water. The amphibious airplane sustained substantial damage to the right wing lift strut, empennage, right wing aileron, rudder, and elevator. The pilot was the sole occupant of the aircraft and sustained minor injuries, which was attributed to the pilot's failure to use the before landing checklist.

References

External links

Airports in Miami-Dade County, Florida
Seaplane bases in the United States
1926 establishments in Florida
Airports established in 1926